Northern Star is the debut album by English electronic music duo Groove Armada, released in March 1998 by record label Tummy Touch.

Reception 

Critical response to the album has been mixed. Stephen Dalton of NME called it "an oddly schizoid mix of trendy beats and old-skool snoozerama".

Track listing

References

External links 

 

1998 debut albums
Groove Armada albums